Coyotepec is a municipality in State of Mexico, Mexico. The municipality covers an area of  12.30 km² and, in 2005, had a total population of 39,341. 

The name comes from the Nahuatl coyotl (coyote) and tepetl (hill), with the locative suffix c: thus, "hill of the coyote" or "place of coyotes".

References

Municipalities of the State of Mexico